Pearl Fryar (born December 4, 1939) is an American topiary artist living in Bishopville, South Carolina.

Biography 

Pearl Fryar was born on December 4, 1939 in Clinton, North Carolina to a sharecropper family. In the late 1950s, he attended the North Carolina College in Durham. He served in the military and was in the Korean War. After leaving the military, he moved to Queens, New York. In 1975, he began work as a factory engineer at a Coca-Cola soda can factory in Bishopville until his retirement in 2006.

Initially, Fryar wanted to move into Bishopville's city limits, however he was blocked from purchasing a home in the area due to white residents thinking he wouldn't maintain his property and instead built on the outskirts of town. He began working in his yard to prove his white neighbors wrong with "throwaway" plants rescued from the compost pile at local nurseries and received the 'Yard of the Month' in 1985.

Around 1988, Fryar began trimming the evergreen plants around his yard into unusual shapes. In addition to the boxwood and yew found there originally, he began transplanting holly, fir, loblolly pine and other plants as they became available. His living sculptures are astounding feats of artistry and horticulture. Pearl Fryar and his garden are now internationally recognized and have been the subject of numerous newspaper and magazine articles, television shows.

In 2006, the documentary A Man Named Pearl was produced by Scott Galloway and Brent Pierson about his work.

Pearl Fryar Topiary Garden 

Pearl's garden is a living testament to one man's firm belief in the results of positive thinking, hard work, and perseverance, and his dedication to spreading a message of "love, peace, and goodwill." and today, the Pearl Fryar Topiary Garden draws visitors from around the globe. Visitors to the Pearl Fryar Topiary Garden experience a place that is alternately beautiful, whimsical, educational, and inspiring. Pearl's garden contains over 400 individual plants and is integrated with "junk art" sculptures. The aesthetics of Fryar's work are a departure from traditional topiary work and are considered abstract, inventive, and free-form.

In 2007, the Friends of Pearl Fryar Topiary Garden and the Garden Conservancy formed a partnership with Pearl Fryar to preserve and maintain the Pearl Fryar Topiary Garden and to further Pearl's message of inspiration and hope. In 2008, a scholarship was created by Fryar and the Friends of Pearl Fryar Topiary Garden to provide for students with lower grades.

During 2020-2022, a new nonprofit, The Pearl Fryar Topiary Garden, Inc. was established (the previous one having been dissolved in 2018) and is working collaboratively to continue support and preservation of the artistic and horticultural legacy of Pearl Fryar.  For more information or to donate, please visit http://pearlfryargarden.org/

Awards and accolades 

 “The Heart Garden” collaboration with Philip Simmons for Spoleto Festival USA’s “Human/Nature” installations (1997)
 June 27 was recognized as Pearl Fryar Day by the South Carolina General Assembly for his “humanitarian ideals and artistic influence” (1998)
 Elizabeth O’Neill Verner Governor’s Award for the Arts (2013)
 Award of Excellence from National Garden Clubs Inc. (2017)

References

External links 
The Pearl Fryar Topiary Garden - official site
Official movie site, A Man Named Pearl

American gardeners
Artists from South Carolina
Living people
Outsider artists
1940 births
People from Clinton, North Carolina
People from Bishopville, South Carolina
Artists from North Carolina
20th-century American artists
21st-century American artists
20th-century African-American artists
21st-century African-American artists